Safet "Pape" Sušić (born 13 April 1955) is a Bosnian professional football manager and former player who was most recently the manager of TFF First League club Akhisarspor. He was a gifted midfielder known for his dribbling skills and technical ability, and is strongly reputed to have been one of the finest European players of his generation. Sušić played for Yugoslavia in two FIFA World Cups, 1982 and 1990, and at UEFA Euro 1984. As a manager, he qualified the Bosnia and Herzegovina national team to the 2014 FIFA World Cup.

He played as an attacking midfielder, often in a role of trequartista or fantasista (i.e. a creative playmaker) and rarely as a second striker for Sarajevo, Paris Saint-Germain and Red Star, and internationally for Yugoslavia. Even more later during his career, Sušić was utilized more in a role of a deep-lying playmaker, both for club and national team. In 2010, France Football voted him as Paris Saint-Germain's best player of all time and the best foreign player of Ligue 1 of all time, with his compatriot and friend who also had a spell with PSG, Vahid Halilhodžić, being voted seventh. As part of the UEFA Jubilee Awards in 2004, the Football Association of Bosnia and Herzegovina chose Sušić as the nation's greatest ever player.

Following his retirement from playing, he started working as a manager. He worked for a number of club sides: Cannes, İstanbulspor, Al Hilal, Konyaspor, Ankaragücü, Çaykur Rizespor, Ankaraspor, Évian, Alanyaspor, Akhisarspor and the Bosnia and Herzegovina national team.

Club career

Early career
Born in Zavidovići, FPR Yugoslavia, present-day Bosnia and Herzegovina, Sušić started playing football in the youth team of his hometown club Krivaja. In 1972, he joined the youth team of Sarajevo.

Sarajevo
Sušić made his senior debut for Sarajevo in 1973, one year after joining the youth team. During the 1979–80 season, he was the top scorer in the Yugoslav First League with 17 goals. In 1979, he was honoured as the Yugoslav Footballer of the Year, also being selected as the best athlete hailing from SR Bosnia and Herzegovina. In 1981, Sušić was awarded the Sixth April Award of Sarajevo.

Paris Saint-Germain
In 1982, Sušić signed with Paris Saint-Germain, where he became a star on the European stage. During his first season with the club, Sušić helped PSG to win the 1982–83 Coupe de France, scoring three goals over two legs in the semi-final against Tours, and once in 3–2 victory over Nantes in the final. During the 1985–86 season, Sušić scored ten goals as the Parisiens won their first ever national league title.

Overall, Sušić scored 85 goals and made a record 95 assists for PSG between 1982 and 1991. He is third in the club's all-time appearance list with 344 appearances, tied with Paul Le Guen, meaning he is the highest placed non-Frenchman on the list. On 22 September 1984, in a 7–1 home drubbing of Bastia, he assisted on five of the side's goals. At 36, Sušić went to the second Paris-based club for a final year with Red Star.

On 5 February 2010, France Football chose Sušić as the best player in the history of Paris Saint-Germain, ahead of players such as Carlos Bianchi, Mustapha Dahleb, Ronaldinho, George Weah, Joël Bats, Raí and Luis Fernández.

Red Star
In his only season with Red Star, he played in Ligue 2, the second division of French Football. He played in 17 league games for the club in that season campaign, scoring 3 goals in the process. Shortly after leaving Red Star, Sušić announced his retirement from football in 1992.

International career
During Sušić's playing career, Bosnia and Herzegovina was part of SFR Yugoslavia and thus he represented the Yugoslavia national team at international level.

Between 1977 and 1990, Sušić appeared 54 times for Yugoslavia, scoring 21 times. He debuted for his country in 1977 and scored his first goals for the team against Hungary in October of that year. A month later, he scored a hat-trick in a 6–4 victory against Romania during the 1978 FIFA World Cup qualification. However, this was Yugoslavia's only victory of their group and they failed to qualify for the tournament finals.

In June 1979, Sušić scored his second international hat-trick as Yugoslavia beat Italy 4–1 in a friendly match held in Zagreb. In September, he again scored three times in a 4–2 win over world champions Argentina.

Sušić was a member of the Yugoslav team that qualified for the 1982 FIFA World Cup, scoring once in a 5–0 win against Luxembourg.

Sušić was top scorer of Yugoslavia in qualification for UEFA Euro 1984. His two goals in a 3–2 win over Bulgaria in the final qualification fixture helped Yugoslavia to finish three points ahead of the Bulgarians and one point ahead of Wales and advance to the tournament finals. Yugoslavia ultimately finished bottom of their group in France, losing all three matches.

At the age of 35, Sušić made his second appearance at a World Cup finals as a member of Yugoslavia's squad for the 1990 FIFA World Cup in Italy. He scored his only World Cup goal in the team's 4–1 win against the United Arab Emirates during the group stage. He played 61 minutes before being substituted for Dejan Savićević in the penalty shootout loss to eventual runners-up Argentina at the quarter-final stage. His final international was a November 1990 European Championship qualification match away against Denmark.

In 2004, to celebrate UEFA's Jubilee, Sušić was selected as the Golden Player of Bosnia and Herzegovina by the Football Association of Bosnia and Herzegovina as their most outstanding player of the past 50 years.

His former international teammate, Darko Pančev declared:

Managerial career

Early career
Sušić first managed French club Cannes during the 1994–95 season and the beginning of the 1995–96. From 1996 until 1999, he managed İstanbulspor, then Al Hilal in 2001, Konyaspor from 2004 to 2005, Ankaragücü from 2005 until 2006, Çaykur Rizespor on two occasions, first in 2006 and the second time from 2007 to 2008. Sušić was then hired by Ankaraspor  in March 2008. He left Ankaraspor in June 2008.

Bosnia and Herzegovina

UEFA Euro 2012 qualifying
On 28 December 2009, Sušić was named head coach of the Bosnia and Herzegovina national team. His debut was a friendly match against Ghana in Sarajevo. Bosnia and Herzegovina won the game 2–1 after goals from Vedad Ibišević and Miralem Pjanić. After only 2 wins in Sušić's 6 first matches in charge of the national team, including an important 2–0 loss against France in the UEFA Euro 2012 qualifying, Sušić came under a lot of criticism from several journalists and columnists who called for his head. Sušić recorded a 1–1 draw against France during a second game in Paris and ensured Bosnia and Herzegovina qualified for their second consecutive qualification play-off berth for UEFA Euro 2012 which was played against Portugal in November of that year.

2014 FIFA World Cup

From August 2012 to August 2013, Sušić's Bosnia and Herzegovina side was on a nine-game unbeaten streak run. On 8 August 2013, the Bosnia and Herzegovina national team achieved their highest ever FIFA ranking, 13th place. On 15 October 2013, the country qualified for the 2014 FIFA World Cup in Brazil, their first major tournament in the country's history as an independent nation. Sušić's side fared well in their first World Cup match against Argentina despite losing 2–1. An unlucky own goal and some brilliance from football legend Lionel Messi saw them to a defeat. However, highs taken from the match were the good play the team demonstrated and the materialisation of their first World Cup goal scored by Vedad Ibišević. The team however controversially exited the competition at the group stage of the tournament after their second game against Nigeria having an equaliser scored by Edin Džeko wrongly disallowed for offside. This revitalised the calls for reformation of the FIFA governing body and the replacement of linesmen with technology so as to remove human error from lines decisions. Bosnia and Herzegovina won their last game in the competition against Iran with a healthy 3–1 victory which would've seen them through instead of Nigeria, who incidentally failed to defeat Iran, to a round of 16 match with France.

Contract extension and sacking
In July 2014, Sušić signed a two-year contract to continue as head coach, after he withdrew his resignation. On 17 November 2014, the Football Association of Bosnia and Herzegovina and Sušić parted ways after poor showing of the national team in the first four games of the UEFA Euro 2016 qualifying.

Évian
On 13 July 2015, Sušić was named manager of French Ligue 2 club Évian. On his debut he registered a draw. After the first four rounds, his new side registered four drawn games.

On 11 January 2016, Sušić was sacked by Évian due to a run of poor results at the club. After 20 rounds, the club was placed 13th on the table and were eliminated from the Coupe de la Ligue at the third round. He was replaced by Romain Revelli.

Alanyaspor
On 27 January 2017, Sušić signed a contract with Alanyaspor until June 2018. He was sacked on 25 December 2017 because of a string of poor results.

Akhisarspor
On 30 June 2018, Sušić was named new manager of Turkish Cup winner Akhisarspor.

After about a month and a half, Akhisarspor as cup winners, participated in the Turkish Super Cup match against league champions Galatasaray. The result after full-time was 1–1, but Akhisar won 5–4 on penalties. That was Akhisar's second mayor trophy in the club's history and the first in Sušić's managing career.

On 17 September 2018, after only collecting two points in five games in the league, Sušić was sacked.

Legacy

Safet Sušić Pape is a bestseller novel written by Bosnian novelist Zlatko Topčić, and published in 2007. Popular Sarejevo sketch comedy and variety TV series, Top Lista Nadrealista, also on occasion treated a subject of football and popular sportsmen-women in their program, with songs dedicated to Sušić and Yugoslav national football team under management of another Sarajevan, Ivica Osim, being prominent feature of couple episodes.

Personal life
Sušić comes from a sporting family. Sead Sušić, a former footballer, is Safet's older brother. Safet's nephew, Tino-Sven Sušić, is also a footballer, formerly even a player of Sarajevo who also alongside Safet appeared at the 2014 FIFA World Cup in Brazil. Safet's mother Paša died on 28 April 2018 at the age of 96.

Career statistics

Club

International

International goals
Scores and results list Yugoslavia's goal tally first, score column indicates score after each Sušić goal.

Managerial statistics

Honours

Player
Paris Saint-Germain
French Division 1: 1985–86
Coupe de France: 1982–83

Individual
Awards
Ligue 1 Foreign Player of the Year: 1982–83
Yugoslav Footballer of the Year: 1979
UEFA Jubilee Awards – Greatest Bosnian Footballer of the last 50 Years: 2003

Performance
Yugoslav First League Top Goalscorer: 1979–80 (17 goals)

Manager
Akhisarspor
Turkish Super Cup: 2018

Individual
Bosnia and Herzegovina Manager of the Year: 2013

Awards
Sixth April Award of Sarajevo: 1981

References

External links

1955 births
Living people
People from Zavidovići
Bosniaks of Bosnia and Herzegovina
Association football midfielders
Yugoslav footballers
Yugoslavia international footballers
1982 FIFA World Cup players
1990 FIFA World Cup players
UEFA Euro 1984 players
UEFA Golden Players
FK Sarajevo players
Paris Saint-Germain F.C. players
Red Star F.C. players
Yugoslav First League players
Ligue 1 players
Ligue 2 players
Yugoslav expatriate footballers
Expatriate footballers in France
Yugoslav expatriate sportspeople in France
Bosnia and Herzegovina football managers
AS Cannes managers
İstanbulspor managers
Al Hilal SFC managers
Konyaspor managers
MKE Ankaragücü managers
Çaykur Rizespor managers
Ankaraspor managers
Bosnia and Herzegovina national football team managers
2014 FIFA World Cup managers
Thonon Evian Grand Genève F.C. managers
Alanyaspor managers
Akhisarspor managers
Ligue 1 managers
Süper Lig managers
Saudi Professional League managers
Ligue 2 managers
Bosnia and Herzegovina expatriate football managers
Expatriate football managers in France
Bosnia and Herzegovina expatriate sportspeople in France
Expatriate football managers in Turkey
Bosnia and Herzegovina expatriate sportspeople in Turkey
Turkish people of Bosnia and Herzegovina descent
Expatriate football managers in Saudi Arabia
Bosnia and Herzegovina expatriate sportspeople in Saudi Arabia